Nina Koppang, (born 31 May 2002) is a Swedish handball player, currently playing for IK Sävehof.

Career 
Koppang started playing handball in Vadstena HF. She also played football in Vadstena GIF. In 2018 she moved from Vadstena to attend a sports school, and with that she changed to IK Sävehof's youth team. She also continued playing football, now for Göteborg FC's youth team, however only for around 6 months until she decided to quit football and fully focus on handball. The season of 2020/21 was her first in IK Sävehof's senior team.

When she was 16 she played for the Swedish U16 national team in football. In handball, she participated in the U17 European Championship 2019, where Sweden brought home a silver medal. She also participated in the U19 European Championship 2021, where Sweden ended up on the fourth place. There, she was chosen for the All-Star Team as best right back. She made a debut in the senior national team in April 2021 in a game against Hungary, when Sweden's original squad had a Coronavirus outbreak and had to be fully replaced.

Achievements 
Swedish Championship:
Winner: 2022
Swedish Cup:
Winner: 2023

Personal life 
She is the younger half-sister of the Swedish football player Stina Blackstenius.

References 

Swedish female handball players
2002 births
Living people
IK Sävehof players
21st-century Swedish women